Simple Love may refer to:

 Simple Love (album), by David Dondero
 "Simple Love", by Markus Feehily, from the album Fire
 "Simple Love", by Meghan Trainor, from the album Meghan Trainor